Soe Kyaw Kyaw (born 16 February 1991) is a footballer from Burma, and a striker for the Myanmar national football team and Ayeyawady United.

Club career
He currently plays for Ayeyawady United in Myanmar National League.

References

1991 births
Living people
Burmese footballers
Myanmar international footballers
Yadanarbon F.C. players
Ayeyawady United F.C. players
Association football forwards